Christian Patria (January 9, 1945, Fontaine-Chaalis – February 10, 2014) was a French politician and a member of the National Assembly of France. He represented the Oise department, and was a member of the Union for a Popular Movement.

References

1945 births
2014 deaths
People from Oise
Politicians from Hauts-de-France
Union for a Popular Movement politicians
Deputies of the 12th National Assembly of the French Fifth Republic
Deputies of the 13th National Assembly of the French Fifth Republic